Coe is an unincorporated community located in Monroe County, Kentucky, United States.

References

Unincorporated communities in Monroe County, Kentucky
Unincorporated communities in Kentucky